Shrinkwrapped is the sixth studio album by Gang of Four.  It was released in 1995 on Castle Communications. Some of the songs are featured on the Peter Hall film, Delinquent.

Critical reception
Trouser Press wrote that the album "never overcomes the disappointment of hearing such former iconoclasts flaunt fairly conventional music, lyrics and (courtesy of Gill) production values."

Track listing
All tracks composed by Andy Gill and Jon King; except where indicated

 "Tattoo" - 4:08
 "Sleepwalker" 3:30
 "I Parade Myself" - 4:10
 "Unburden" (Gill) - 3:13
 "Better Him Than Me" - 3:49
 "Something 99" - 2:49
 "Showtime, Valentine" - 4:42
 "Unburden Unbound" (Gill) - 2:45
 "The Dark Ride" - 3:35
 "I Absolve You" - 4:04
 "Shrinkwrapped" - 3:25

Personnel
 Andy Gill - guitar, vocals, (bass on some tracks?)
 Jon King - vocals
 Phil Butcher - bass on tracks 1, 3 and 9
 Dean Garcia - bass on tracks 2 and 6
 Steve Monti - drums on tracks 1, 3-5, 7, 9 and 11
 Dave Axford - drums on tracks 2 and 6
 Catherine Mayer - sex worker vocal on track 4
Technical
Andy Gill, Jon King - front cover artwork concept
Andy Gill, Hugh Gilmour - design

References

1995 albums
Gang of Four (band) albums
Albums produced by Andy Gill